The Ruggles-Brise Baronetcy, of Spains Hall in Finchingfield in the County of Essex, is a title in the Baronetage of the United Kingdom. It was created on 31 January 1935 for the Conservative politician Edward Ruggles-Brise. The second Baronet was Lord-Lieutenant of Essex from 1958 to 1978.

Guy Ruggles-Brise, younger son of the first baronet, was High Sheriff of Essex between 1967 and 1968.

Ruggles-Brise baronets, of Spains Hall (1935)
Sir Edward Archibald Ruggles-Brise, 1st Baronet (1882–1942)
Sir John Archibald Ruggles-Brise, 2nd Baronet (1908–2007)
Sir Timothy Edward Ruggles-Brise, 3rd Baronet (born 1945)

The heir apparent is the present holder's son Archie Ruggles-Brise.

Notes

References
Kidd, Charles, Williamson, David (editors). Debrett's Peerage and Baronetage (1990 edition). New York: St Martin's Press, 1990, 

Ruggles-Brise
People from Finchingfield